Izatha picarella is a moth of the family Oecophoridae. It is endemic to New Zealand, where it is known from the Nelson and Marlborough districts of the northern South Island.

The wingspan is 22.5–28.5 mm for males and 20.5–28 mm for females. Adults are on wing from September to January.

Larvae have been reared from dead wood of apple (probably Malus domesticus) and from dead branches of Melicytus ramiflorus.

References

Oecophorinae